The Jams is a  waterfall along Cache Creek in Lake County, California. The lowest tier is an above ground waterfall while the upper two tiers cascade underground through talus caves caused by boulders falling off the surrounding cliffs  and into the creek channel. The Jams is a class IV rapid during high flows and is completely impassable since the river flows into the boulders and through the talus caves.

References

Waterfalls of California